In the study of ancient Egyptian mathematics, red auxiliary numbers are numbers written in red ink in the Rhind Mathematical Papyrus, apparently used as aids for arithmetic computations involving fractions.It is considered to be the first examples of  method that uses Least common multiples.

References

Egyptian mathematics
Egyptian fractions
Mathematics manuscripts